NCache may refer to:

 DNS NCACHE, an Internet standard used by the Domain Name System
 NCACHE, a disk caching utility included in the Norton Utilities utility suite